Assumption Grammar School (also known as 'The Assumption', 'Assumption Grammar' or 'AGS’) is a Catholic girls' grammar school in Ballynahinch, County Down, Northern Ireland with over 900 students.

History
The school was founded by the Missionary Sisters of the Assumption in 1933, and approved by the Ministry of Education in 1936. The first principal was Mother Baptist McKenny. It is the only Assumption school in Ireland. The school is linked with the Assumption school in Grahamstown, South Africa.

Facilities
The school officially opened its new school building on Friday 4 May 2012 by Sister Anne Patricia Flynn MSA, the Congregational Leader of the Missionary Sisters of the Assumption. The building hosts two multi-purpose halls, Windmill Restaurant, library, drama suites, ICT suites and music facilities including a music technology suite. The school grounds include a Gaelic football and camogie pitch and an astro-turf pitch.

Academics
Admission to the school is by examination and entrance to Year 13 or Lower Sixth is based on GCSE grades.

The school offers instruction in a full range of subjects including: Art & Design, Biology, Business Studies, Chemistry, Computing, Digital Technology, Drama, Economics, English, English Literature, Food & Nutrition, French, Further Mathematics, Geography, Health & Social Care, History, Irish, Learning for Life & Work, Mathematics, Moving Image Arts, Music, Physical Education, Physics, Politics, Psychology, Religious Studies, Science, Sociology, Spanish, Statistics, Technology & Design and Theatre Studies.

The school is currently a Specialist School for Music with PE as a subsidiary subject. Assumption Grammar now works along with 8 partner schools in the community providing opportunities for primary school children to have greater access to music both in and out of the classroom and allowing post-primary students the chance to study Music at GCSE.

In 2018 it was ranked joint first in Northern Ireland for its GCSE performance with 100% of its entrants receiving five or more GCSEs at grades A* to C, including the core subjects English and Maths.

85.4% of its A-level students who sat the exams in 2017/18 were awarded three A*-C grades.

Houses
Upon entry to the school, students are placed into one of five houses - Knock (Blue), Saul (Green), Drogheda (Purple), Iona (Red) and Faughart (Yellow).  These are named after important religious sites in Ireland and Scotland. The Patrons of each house are as follows:
 Knock - Our Lady
 Saul - St Patrick
 Drogheda - St Oliver Plunkett
 Iona - St Colmcille
 Faughart - St Brigid

Extra-curricular activities

Sport
The school has several sports teams including netball, camogie, dance, athletics, horse riding, cross country and Gaelic football.
The Gaelic team is split into four teams: Year 8, Under 14, Under 16 and Under 20. The camogie is split likewise with the exception of the Under 20s, which is simply called the Senior team. The school has entered five netball teams into the NI League and Cup competitions and three into the East Down League. Two teams of 8 pupils will be selected from Year 8 for the East Down Tournament which is to be held in May.

The minor team and Year 9 A team are entered into the Rockport Invitational Tournament held in May. A dance team takes part in the NI Creative and Dance Competition, which is held in March.

Music
The music department offers lessons for strings, woodwind, brass, traditional instruments, percussion and voice. Students are prepared for graded examinations through the Associated Board of the Royal Schools of Music in both practical and theory. They may also take exams in Traditional Music through the London College of Music and Drums through the ‘Rockschool’ system.

The current music groups and ensembles are Senior Orchestra, Training Orchestra, Senior and Junior Chamber Ensembles, several string ensembles such as quartets, trios and sextets, Senior and Junior Choirs, Senior and Junior Barbershop, Chamber Choir, Jazz Ensemble, Irish Traditional Group and a djembe group. The school hosts annual concerts which have taken place in the Waterfront Hall and the Ulster Hall, both situated in Belfast. Many of the music students take part in the Holywood and Ballymena Festivals every year. Assumption won the Best School (Instrumental) award at the Ballymena Festival in 2011.

Principals
For the first 67 years of its existence the school was led by a religious sister but since 2000 it has been led by a lay principal.
 1933-1937: Mother Baptist McKenny
 1937-1940: Sister Joachim Baker
 1940-1960: Sister Pauline Mawson
 1960-1983: Sister Jarlath McKenna
 1983-1994: Sister Eileen Bogues
 1994-2000: Sister Maureen Carville
 2000-2008: Mrs Sheila Crea
 2008-2014: Mr Paul McBride
 2014-Present: Mr Peter Dobbin

Notable alumnae
 Brid Brennan (born 1955) - actress
 Brenda King (born 1964) - Attorney General for Northern Ireland
 Leontia Flynn (born 1974) - poet
 Ciara Mageean (born 1992) -athlete
 Niamh McGrady (born 1983) - actress 
 Mary Rose McGrath (fashion designer)
 Eileen O'Higgins - actress
 Julie Sinnamon (Chief Executive, Enterprise Ireland)

References

Educational institutions established in 1933
Grammar schools in County Down
Catholic secondary schools in Northern Ireland
Girls' schools in Northern Ireland
Secondary schools in County Down
1933 establishments in Northern Ireland
Specialist colleges in Northern Ireland